Wallace Grissell (3 September 1904 – 5 April 1954) was a British director and editor.

Filmography
The Tiger Woman (1944)
Marshal of Reno (1944)
Haunted Harbor (1944)
Vigilantes of Dodge City (1944)
Zorro's Black Whip (1944)
Manhunt of Mystery Island (1945)
Corpus Christi Bandits (ca Wallace A. Grissell, 1945)Wanderer of the Wasteland (1945)Federal Operator 99 (1945)Who's Guilty? (1945)Motor Maniacs (film scurt, 1946 )Let's Make Rhythm (film scurt, 1947)Tex Beneke and the Glenn Miller Band (film scurt, 1947)Wild Horse Mesa (ca Wallace A. Grissell, 1947)Western Heritage (ca Wallace A. Grissell, 1948)Captain Video: Master of the Stratosphere (ca Wallace A. Grissell, 1951)A Yank in Indo-China (1952)King of the Congo (ca Wallace A. Grissell, 1952)Jungle Gold (film TV, 1966)Captain Mephisto and the Transformation Machine'' (film TV, 1966)

External links
 

1904 births
1954 deaths
People from the London Borough of Hounslow
Film directors from London
British expatriates in the United States